The word "paxilla" may refer to:
 Paxilla (ossicle)
 Paxilla (genus): a genus of insects in the family Tetrigidae